This is a list of Chinese national-type primary schools (SJK(C)) in Perak, Malaysia. As of June 2022, there are 185 Chinese primary schools with a total of 39,967 students.

List of Chinese national-type primary schools in Perak

Batang Padang District 
As of June 2022, there are 18 Chinese primary schools with 1,488 students in Batang Padang District.

Manjung District
As of June 2022, there are 24 Chinese primary schools with 5,153 students in Manjung District.

Kinta District
As of June 2022, there are 45 Chinese primary schools with 17,517 students in Kinta District.

Kerian District
As of June 2022, there are 10 Chinese primary schools with 2,075 students in Kerian District.

Kuala Kangsar District
As of June 2022, there are 16 Chinese primary schools with 2,301 students in Kuala Kangsar District.

Hilir Perak District
As of June 2022, there are 9 Chinese primary schools with 2,318 students in Hilir Perak District.

Larut, Matang and Selama District
As of June 2022, there are 23 Chinese primary schools with 4,209 students in Larut, Matang and Selama District.

Hulu Perak District
As of June 2022, there are 11 Chinese primary schools with 850 students in Hulu Perak District.

Perak Tengah District

Kampar District
As of June 2022, there are 12 Chinese primary schools with 2,439 students in Kampar District.

Muallim District 
As of June 2022, there are 5 Chinese primary schools with 668 students in Muallim District.

Bagan Datuk District
As of June 2022, there are 11 Chinese primary schools with 917 students in Bagan Datuk District.

See also
Lists of Chinese national-type primary schools in Malaysia

Footnotes

References

 
Schools in Perak
Perak
Chinese-language schools in Malaysia